Susan Kent (born November 18, 1963) is a Minnesota politician and former minority leader of the Minnesota Senate. A member of the Minnesota Democratic–Farmer–Labor Party (DFL), she represents District 53 in the eastern Twin Cities metropolitan area.

Early life, education, and career
Kent was born in 1963 in New Orleans, Louisiana. She earned her bachelor's degree in communication studies from the University of Texas at Austin.

Minnesota Senate
Kent was first elected to the Minnesota Senate in 2012.

In late 2019, it was reported that Kent intended to challenge Minority Leader Tom Bakk for his caucus leadership post. On February 1, 2020, after a private meeting that lasted more than six hours, the caucus elected Kent as its new leader. In September 2021 Susan Kent announced that she would not run for re-election, also choosing to step down as Senate Minority Leader.

Personal life
Kent met her husband, Chris, a Maplewood native and 3M employee, in Austin, Texas. The couple moved to Woodbury, Minnesota in the mid-2000s. They have one child.

References

External links

Senator Susan Kent official Minnesota Senate website
Senator Susan Kent official campaign website

1963 births
21st-century American politicians
21st-century American women politicians
Living people
Democratic Party Minnesota state senators
People from Woodbury, Minnesota
University of Texas at Austin alumni
Women state legislators in Minnesota
Politicians from New Orleans